St Luke's is a Grade II* listed Church of England church in Chiddingstone Causeway, Kent. It was built in 1897–1898 to a design by John Francis Bentley in a loosely Decorated Gothic Revival style, replacing a tin tabernacle (erected circa 1873). 

According to Pevsner the church was financed by the Hill family and John Singer Sargent recommended Bentley to him. It was the only Protestant church designed by Bentley.

Since 2019 the church is part of the High Weald Churches benefice of Penshurst, Chiddingstone, Fordcombe and Chiddingstone Causeway.

The altar window is the work of Wilfrid de Glehn.

References

Grade II* listed churches in Kent
Sevenoaks District
Church of England church buildings in Kent